Raphael Dwamena (born 12 September 1995) is a Ghanaian professional footballer who plays as a striker for Albanian club Egnatia Rrogozhinë.

Playing career

Early years
Born in Nkawkaw, Dwamena played and trained with the Red Bull Ghana developmental program. At the International Tournament in Croix, France, in 2013, Dwamena helped the RB Ghana U17 team to a silver medal performance, and was named the tournament's Best Player. Before returning to Ghana, Dwamena and his teammate, David Atanga, first traveled to Austria for a one-week trial with FC Red Bull Salzburg.

Dwamena joined the Salzburg youth team in January 2014, and immediately made an impact on the U18 squad. In one tournament in June, he racked up seven goals in four games. Although Salzburg finished in third, he won the Golden Shoe.

FC Liefering
In July 2014, Dwamena was promoted to FC Liefering, the Salzburg farm team playing in the Austrian Football First League. He made his professional debut on 18 July, where in the 82nd minute of a 3–0 win over Hartberg, Dwamena was substituted in for Nikola Dovedan. He was one of six Liefering players making their professional debuts that day. He played in one more game that season.

During the 2015–16 season, Dwamena made his first start for Liefering on 21 August against Wiener Neustadt. He played the 90 minutes in place of Smail Prevljak. On 18 September, in his fifth straight start, Dwamena scored his first professional goal. He scored in a 4–1 win over Austria Klagenfurt.

Austria Lustenau
Dwamena enjoyed a successful half-season with Austria Lustenau, scoring 18 goals in 20 games, before his transfer to FC Zürich.

FC Zürich
Raphael Dwamena completed a transfer to FC Zürich on 27 January 2017. He made an immediate impact at his new club by scoring 12 goals in 18 matches, helping Zürich to win the 2016–17 Swiss Challenge League and gain promotion to the Swiss Super League.

On his Swiss Super League debut, Dwamena scored two goals against Grasshoppers.

On 21 August 2017, Zürich agreed a fee with Premier League club Brighton & Hove Albion for the transfer of Dwamena. He was set to join Brighton subject to passing a medical, obtaining a work permit and international clearance, however the deal fell through after Dwamena failed his medical due to a heart condition. He instead, remained an FC Zürich player.

Levante and loan to Zaragoza
On 7 August 2018, Dwamena signed a four-year contract with La Liga side Levante UD. The following 16 July, he was loaned out to Segunda División club Real Zaragoza for one year.

In October 2019, after new examinations were carried on his heart condition, the doctors recommended his immediate withdrawal and retirement from football. He, however, continued after having implemented an implantable cardioverter-defibrillator (ICD) in January 2020.

Vejle
On 20 August 2020, Dwamena moved to Vejle Boldklub in the Danish Superliga. He scored in his debut in the Superliga, as Vejle lost 4–2 to rivals AGF. He was withdrawn from team activities after complications of his heart condition were detected before a Superliga match against AaB. At that point, he had made five league appearances for the newly promoted Superliga club and scored twice.

Due to his heart condition and some worrying measurements, Vejle confirmed on 26 October 2020, that Dwamena couldn't play for a period. Later in November 2020, the clubs sporting director stated, that Dwamena had played his last game for the club.

Return to Austria
On 25 June 2021 he returned to Austria and signed a two-year contract with Blau-Weiß Linz. On 28 October 2021, Dwamena collapsed on the field during an Austrian Cup game against TSV Hartberg as the game was abandoned. He recovered in the hospital, but has not played since then.

International career
Dwamena didn't get the chance to play for the youth national teams of his country Ghana. Raphael Dwamena was called into the senior team as part of the 30-man squad for the 2017 African Cup of Nations but was dropped from the 23-man squad.

Raphael Dwamena made his international debut on the 11 June 2017 in an African Cup of Nations qualifier against Ethiopia, where he scored a brace to mark the new era of youngsters being introduced into the national team.

Personal life
Dwamena was diagnosed with a heart condition in 2017. In January 2020, while at Levante UD he had an implantable cardioverter-defibrillator (ICD) implanted through surgery, which enabled his club to monitor his heart during matches. In October 2020, the ICD showed values which were considered too high, and his club at the time, Vejle Boldklub, withdrew him from team activities as a result.

In October 2021 in Austrian Cup match during the first half of Blau-Weiss Linz's game against Harterg, Dwamena collapsed on pitch and was shocked by an ICD and stabilized quickly.

Career statistics

Club

International Games

International goals
Scores and results list Ghana's goal tally first.

Honours

Club
Liefering
 Austrian Football First League: Runner-up 2014–15

FC Zurich
 Swiss Challenge League: Winner 2016–17
 Swiss Cup winner: 2017–18

References

External links

 
 

1995 births
Living people
Ghanaian footballers
Ghana international footballers
Association football forwards
FC Liefering players
SC Austria Lustenau players
FC Zürich players
Levante UD footballers
Real Zaragoza players
Vejle Boldklub players
FC Blau-Weiß Linz players
2. Liga (Austria) players
Swiss Challenge League players
Swiss Super League players
La Liga players
Danish Superliga players
People from Eastern Region (Ghana)
Ghanaian expatriate footballers
Ghanaian expatriate sportspeople in Austria
Ghanaian expatriate sportspeople in Spain
Ghanaian expatriate sportspeople in Switzerland
Ghanaian expatriate sportspeople in Denmark
Expatriate footballers in Austria
Expatriate footballers in Spain
Expatriate footballers in Switzerland
Expatriate men's footballers in Denmark